Sir George Edward Godber  (4 August 1908 – 7 February 2009) served as Chief Medical Officer for Her Majesty's Government in England from 1960 to 1973. He was also part of the team that planned the National Health Service (NHS) and, as deputy Chief Medical Officer and subsequently Chief Medical officer, campaigned against smoking and for immunization against polio and diphtheria.

Early life and education 
Godber was born on 4 August 1908, the son of Bessie Maud (née Chapman) and Isaac Godber, a nurseryman in Willington, Bedfordshire; he was the third of seven children, 5 boys and 2 girls. When he was eleven he lost sight in one eye due to an accident.

Godber was educated at Bedford Modern School between 1917 and 1920, at Bedford School between 1920 and 1927, and at New College, Oxford, where he read medicine, gained a rowing blue and took part in two losing boat races. He was partly inspired to pursue the public health by his Warden, the historian H.A.L. Fisher who had been Lloyd George's Education Secretary.

Another mentor was a young New College don, Richard Crossman, who was later to become Godber's Secretary of State for Health and Social Security. He did his clinical training at The London Hospital and qualified in 1933.

Career 
After completing his clinical training, Godber was employed in a variety of junior posts that gave him an insight into the state of the nation's health. At a casualty ward in a municipal hospital in London's Docklands, he found that many of his patients were people with serious diseases who were too poor to go to their GP and too proud to ask for a free service, convincing him that a state-funded health service based on need was required.

Limited by the lack of medical specialties afforded to him with the loss of his eye, and due to his aversion of taking fees from patients, he decided to specialise in public health medicine and attended the London School of Hygiene and Tropical Medicine, earning a diploma in public health in 1936.

In 1937, Godber became a county medical officer in Surrey where he worked on communicable diseases.  In 1939 he joined the Ministry of Health as a medical officer. During World War II he worked in Birmingham administering the wartime Emergency Medical Services.

Godber served as Deputy Chief Medical Officer from 1950 to 1960. He was instrumental is persuading the Royal College of Physicians to form a committee on smoking and lung cancer in 1958.  Their report Smoking and Health, published in 1962, was important in bringing the link to the attention of the public.

Godber was awarded an honorary doctorate of science from the University of Bath in 1979. He was appointed CB in 1958, KCB in 1962 and GCB in 1971. Godber celebrated his 100th birthday in August 2008 and died on 7 February 2009.

References

Further reading

External links

Bedford Today (mentions his 100th birthday)
History of the National Health Service
Obituary in The Times
Obituary in The Daily Telegraph
Obituary in The Guardian

1908 births
2009 deaths
British centenarians
Men centenarians
People from Bedford
People educated at Bedford Modern School
People educated at Bedford School
Alumni of New College, Oxford
Oxford University Boat Club rowers
Chief Medical Officers for England
Knights Grand Cross of the Order of the Bath
George
Léon Bernard Foundation Prize laureates